Iwogumoa insidiosa, formerly Coelotes insidiosus, is a species of spider in the family Agelenidae, found in Russia, Korea and Japan. It makes a home like a tube in stone walls, and also in paving stones around garden lanterns. The spider is 8-12 millimeters.

References

Spiders of Asia
Agelenidae
Spiders described in 1878